Osman bin Aroff (born 23 November 1940) is a Malaysian politician. He is a member of the United Malays National Organisation (UMNO), a component party in Barisan Nasional (BN) coalition. He was the Menteri Besar of Kedah from 28 January 1985 to 16 June 1996.

Early life and education
Born in Jitra, Kedah on 23 November 1940, he received his early education at Sekolah Melayu Jitra until the fourth grade. Next in 1951, he continued his secondary education at Sultan Abdul Hamid College, Alor Setar, Kedah.  He graduated from Cambridge Senior in 1958. From 1959 to 1963, he continued his studies in Political Science at Washington University in St. Louis.

Personal life
He is married to Puan Sri Azizah Abdul Hamid and has 4 children.

Honours

Honours of Malaysia
  :
  Companion of the Order of the Defender of the Realm (JMN) (1984)
  Commander of the Order of Loyalty to the Crown of Malaysia (PSM) – Tan Sri (1991)
  :
 Knight Grand Companion of the Order of Loyalty to the Royal House of Kedah (SSDK) – Dato' Seri (1987)
  Grand Commander of the Order of Loyalty to Sultan Abdul Halim Mu'adzam Shah (SHMS) – Dato' Seri Diraja (2010)

References

1940 births
Living people
People from Kedah
Malaysian people of Malay descent
Malaysian Muslims
United Malays National Organisation politicians
Members of the Kedah State Legislative Assembly
Commanders of the Order of Loyalty to the Crown of Malaysia
Companions of the Order of the Defender of the Realm
Washington University in St. Louis alumni